Saint Leopold may refer to:
 Leopold III, Margrave of Austria (1073 – 1136), patron saint of Austria
 Leopold Mandić (1866 - 1942), Croat-born saint
Leopoldo da Gaiche
Saint Leopold Church (Donaufeld), Vienna, Austria

See also
São Leopoldo, city in Brazil